The 1895–96 Northern Rugby Football Union season was the first ever season of semi-professional rugby football, which formed the foundation of the modern-day sport of rugby league. Twenty-two Northern English teams from both sides of the Pennines broke away from the Rugby Football Union to create and compete in their own competition. The inaugural championship ran from September 1895 until April 1896. The Northern Union's first season would prove so popular that the following season saw the addition of several more clubs, and the tournament was split into two separate county competitions.

Background
The Rugby Football Union (RFU) had been organising the British rugby football season for much of the late 19th century, maintaining rules of strict amateurism. However clubs from the largely working-class areas of Northern England believed that their players should be compensated for time taken off work as a result of playing rugby. It was put forth in an RFU meeting that broken time payments should be allowed, but the motion was voted down and all clubs were required to prove their amateurism or face expulsion from the Union.

On Thursday, 29 August 1895 delegates from twelve Yorkshire and nine Lancashire clubs met at The George Hotel in Huddersfield to discuss their dispute with the RFU over compensating players. They voted unanimously to resign from the RFU and set up the Northern Rugby Football Union (to later be renamed the Rugby Football League) and run a competition of their own in which broken time payments were allowed. Mr H. H. Waller, chairman of the Brighouse club, was elected the first ever chairman of the Northern Rugby Football Union. Of the clubs at that meeting, only Dewsbury backed out for the time being, but two Cheshire clubs, Stockport and Runcorn had joined up by the time the new 'Northern Union' played its first games on 7 September.

Rule changes
Each team was to play all other teams twice – once at home and once away. This meant a longer than normal football season so it started a fortnight earlier than usual. In addition to the overall Northern Union championship, these games' results also counted towards final placings in the separate county competitions. The team with the highest standing on the table at the end of the season would be crowned champions of the tournament.

The points system for the Northern Union's rugby was as follows:
Converted try – 5 pts.
Drop goal 4 pts.
Try alone – 3 pts.
Penalty goal – 3 pts.
 A penalty would now be awarded for a deliberate knock-on.

Operational rules
Broken time payments:
 Although full-time professionalism was still banned, payments up to a maximum of six shillings per day were permitted for loss of a player's earnings as a result of playing (based on increases in average earnings, this would have been approximately £118.70 in 2013).

Season summary
The new Northern Union competition kicked off on Saturday, 7 September 1895 and, before it had got properly started (before the second weekend's fixtures), there was a move to change the rules of the game to further the interest of spectators and to make rugby that was distinctively different from that authorised by the RFU. In an experimental game at Valley Parade on 1 October between Manningham and Halifax, thirteen players were on each side, line-outs were abolished and, for part of the game, a round ball was used. A fair crowd was attracted and virtually all the officials of the Northern Union looked on. Play was started with the round ball, but midway through the first half it burst. A conventional oval ball replaced it until another round ball could be found in the second half. Little attempt was made to dribble and kick the round ball and it was thus deemed not to be a success. The game ended 3–3, but the long-term ramifications for the Northern Union were to be great indeed.

The championship hung in the balance until the final game of the tournament. Manningham needed travel to Hunslet and win in order to beat Halifax by a single point and claim the first Northern Union title. The Manningham team left Midland Station at 2.10, but the committee elected to travel in two stagecoaches. A large following travelled with the team and the road adjacent to the ground was crowded with various vehicles flying banners, flags and even Chinese umbrellas in Manningham’s claret and amber colours.

The match was played at a furious pace. A crowd of around 15,000 saw the game swing from end to end. The referee at one point had to halt the match in order to caution the players of both sides as the game was getting extremely rough. The match remained scoreless until the second half when Manningham's Jack Brown attempted a drop kick. The ball struck the post, but flew over the bar to wild cheers. Manningham won 4–0 and thereby became the first ever champions of the Northern Union.

The Northern Union held an additional contest, for determining county champions, and it was won by Lancashire with Yorkshire second and Cheshire third.

League Champions: Manningham
Lancashire League Winners: Runcorn (from Cheshire)
Yorkshire League Winners: Manningham

The season ended on 29 April, which made it three weeks longer than the footballers at the time were used to. Some clubs had also found the regular trans-Pennine journeys more difficult than they'd expected. Therefore, before the season was over the Union had decided to discontinue the championship for the foreseeable future, and instead run enlarged county senior competitions.

The leading try scorer for the season was Jack Hurst from Oldham who crossed the line 28 times. The leading goalkicker for the season was George Lorimer of the Champions, Manningham, who was successful 35 times. The leading point scorer was shared between Cooper of Bradford and George Lorimer of Manningham with a total of 106 points each.

Championship ladder

League points: for win = 2; for draw = 1; for loss = 0.
Pld = Games played; W = Wins; D = Draws; L = Losses; PF = Match points scored; PA = Match points conceded; PD = Points difference; Pts = League points.
Notes

See also
Rugby Football League
History of rugby league

Sources

External links
The Great Schism at rugbyfootballhistory.com
Rugby League's first season at rlhalloffame.org.uk
1895: The Birth of Rugby League at rl1908.com
1895–96 Northern Rugby Football Union season at wigan.rlfans.com
Manningham's first season at bantamspast.co.uk
Rugby League History at rlheritage.co.uk
Birthplace of Rugby League – article at examiner.co.uk

1895 in English rugby league
1896 in English rugby league
History of rugby league
Northern Rugby Football Union seasons